Brooke Creek Bridge is a bridge in Buena Vista County, Iowa. The bridge was completed in 1909. It was added to the National Register of Historic Places in 1998 due to the significance of its historic architecture and engineering.

References

National Register of Historic Places in Buena Vista County, Iowa
Road bridges on the National Register of Historic Places in Iowa
Transportation buildings and structures in Buena Vista County, Iowa
Arch bridges in Iowa
Concrete bridges in the United States